Prothinodes lutata is a species of moth in the family Tineidae. It was described by Edward Meyrick in 1914. This species is endemic to New Zealand.

References

External links
Image of type specimen of Prothinodes lutata.
Citizen science image of Prothinodes lutata.

Moths described in 1914
Tineidae
Moths of New Zealand
Endemic fauna of New Zealand
Taxa named by Edward Meyrick
Endemic moths of New Zealand